Megachilinae is a subfamily of bees, the largest subfamily in the family Megachilidae, and includes mason bees, leafcutter bees, and carder bees.

Tribe Anthidiini
Acedanthidium
Afranthidium
Afrostelis
Anthidiellum
Anthidioma
Anthidium
Anthodioctes
Apianthidium
Aspidosmia
Austrostelis
Aztecanthidium
Bathanthidium
Benanthis
Cyphanthidium
Dianthidium
Duckeanthidium
Eoanthidium
Epanthidium
Euaspis
Hoplostelis
Hypanthidioides
Hypanthidium
Icteranthidium
Indanthidium
Larinostelis
Notanthidium
Pachyanthidium
Paranthidium
Plesianthidium
Pseudoanthidium
Rhodanthidium
Serapista
Stelis Panzer
Trachusa
Trachusoides
Xenostelis
†Tribe Ctenoplectrellini
†Ctenoplectrella 
Tribe Dioxyini
Aglaoapis
Allodioxys
Dioxys
Ensliniana
Eudioxys
Metadioxys
Paradioxys
Prodioxys
Tribe Lithurgini
Lithurgus
Microthurge
Trichothurgus
Tribe Megachilini
Coelioxys
Megachile
Radoszkowskiana
Tribe Osmiini
Afroheriades
Ashmeadiella
Atoposmia
Bekilia
Chelostoma
Haetosmia
Heriades
Hofferia
Hoplitis
Hoplosmia
Noteriades
Ochreriades
Osmia
Othinosmia
Protosmia
Pseudoheriades
Stenoheriades
Stenosmia
Wainia
Xeroheriades
Incertae Sedis
Neochalicodoma
Stellenigris

References

External links

Megachilidae
Bee subfamilies